The International Association for Environmental Philosophy (IAEP) is a philosophical organization focused on the field of environmental philosophy.

Since 2004 it publishes the peer-reviewed academic journal Environmental Philosophy.

External links 
 IAEP website

International environmental organizations
Environmental philosophy
Ethics organizations